Legal aid in the United States is the provision of assistance to people who are unable to afford legal representation and access to the court system in the United States. In the US, legal aid provisions are different for criminal law and civil law. Criminal legal aid with legal representation is guaranteed to defendants under criminal prosecution (related to the charges) who cannot afford to hire an attorney. Civil legal aid is not guaranteed under federal law, but is provided by a variety of public interest law firms and community legal clinics for free (pro bono) or at reduced cost. Other forms of civil legal aid are available through federally-funded legal services, pro bono lawyers, and private volunteers.

Criminal legal aid 

In 1942, the Supreme Court ruled in Betts v Brady that courts were to assign legal aid on a case-by-case basis. In overturning this case, the court held in Gideon v Wainwright that the average citizen "lacks both the skill and knowledge adequately to prepare his defense, even though he have a perfect one. He requires the guiding hand of counsel at every step in the proceedings against him." Later, the court expanded the right to include misdemeanors, and capital offenses. The federal government and some states have offices of public defenders who assist indigent defendants, while other states have systems for outsourcing the work to private lawyers. Although public defenders are required to be provided at the trial level, free attorney services for appeals and appeals court are often not available. Funding for criminal aid come from both U.S. States and the U.S. federal government.

Civil legal aid

A concerted movement towards substantive civil legal aid in the United States did not develop until the mid-1900s. The earliest developments trace back to 1876, with the first known legal aid society, the German Immigrants' Society, being founded in New York. By 1965, there were around 157 legal aid organizations across the country, serving almost every major city. The landmark Supreme Court decision Gideon v. Wainwright guaranteed the right to counsel in criminal matters, but left the issue of civil aid unresolved. Critically, following Gideon v Wainwright, the Court did not extend a guarantee of legal aid to civil matters in Lassiter v Department of Social Services, holding that the provision was less necessary in matters where liberty was not at stake.

The movement towards extending Gideon to civil matters continues to gain momentum, even as states such as New York and California lead the way in establishing more substantive legal aid systems.

Legal aid for civil cases is currently provided by a variety of public interest law firms and community legal clinics, who often have "legal aid" or "legal services" in their names. Public interest practice emerged from the goal of promoting access to equal justice for the poor and this was inspired from the legal services disparity amongst European immigrants. Such firms may impose income and resource ceilings as well as restrictions on the types of cases they will take, due to the sheer volume of potential clients and the general lack of funding for such work.

Common types of cases taken as legal aid include:

 Denial or deprivation of government benefits
 Evictions
 Domestic violence
 Immigration status
 Discrimination

In 2006, the American Bar Association adopted a resolution that defined such issues as "basic human needs," and urged the Federal government to provide legal services in such instances. Some legal aid organizations serve as outside counsel to small nonprofit organizations that lack in-house counsel.

Most typical legal aid work involves counseling, informal negotiation, and appearances in administrative hearings, as opposed to formal litigation in the courts. However, the discovery of severe or recurring injustice with a large number of victims will sometimes justify the cost of large-scale impact litigation. Education and law reform activities are also sometimes undertaken.

History

Office of Economic Opportunity (OEO)
The first legal aid program to exist at the federal level was implemented though the Office of Economic Opportunity (OEO), founded in 1965. the OEO was established through the Economic Opportunity Act as part of the Johnson administration's War on Poverty. The first director of OEO, Sargent Shriver, moved the organization towards the provision of legal aid. In an interview in which Shriver was asked which program from the War on Poverty he most preferred, he replied that "I am proudest of Legal Services because I recognized that it had the greatest potential for changing the system under which people's lives were being exploited."

Legal Services for the Poor 
The United States' first attempt at providing legal remedy came about in 1965. The Office of Economic Opportunity created the Legal Services for the Poor program, under the direction of Sargent Shriver. The ideology behind the program used the "justice model", as it went beyond providing access to legal aid. Its focus was to dismantle barriers faced by those unable to afford legal protections on grounds of discrimination based upon race, gender, and/or class. In this way, the state sought to alleviate poverty using legal remedies, tackling the legal causes of poverty. This approach was employed in the "war on poverty" under the Johnson administration. The new pool of antipoverty lawyers worked to transform the lives of those oppressed by poverty en masse. Using a unique combination of understanding poverty-causing factors while pursuing economic justice, this work aimed to transform the social world that constructed and produced poverty conditions.

In the late 1960s, however, the US saw backlash as those who faced marginalization and poverty became the recipients of economic and social program boons. The "justice model" would be replaced by the "access to justice" model in response to the rapid societal changes occurring within American society under the Nixon administration. This new approach would be crafted under the Legal Services Corporation (LSC), and would have a more individualistic focus with limited social impact, as the United States does not stipulate that legal services are a right to be guaranteed. "Access to justice" is the model that legal aid offices and services would follow for future organizations.

Legal Services Corporation (LSC) 
Civil legal aid appeared as early as the 1870s. In the early 1960s, a new model for legal services emerged. Foundations, particularly the Ford Foundation, began to fund legal services programs located in multi-service social agencies, based on a philosophy that legal services should be a component of an overall anti-poverty effort. In 1974, Congress created the Legal Services Corporation (LSC) to provide federal funding for civil (non-criminal) legal aid services. By 1975, the Legal Service Corporation had taken over the function of OEO, leaving its organizational structure largely unchanged. Funding usually comes from the federal government Legal Services Corporation (LSC), Interest on Lawyer Trust Accounts, charities, private donors, and some state and local governments. Legal aid organizations that take LSC money tend to have more staff and services and can help more clients, but must also conform to strict government regulations that require careful timekeeping and prohibit lobbying and class actions. Organizations that receive LSC funding cannot take funding from non LSC sources to pursue legislative efforts that contradict LSC regulations. In addition to lobbying and class actions, LSC organizations cannot purse abortion related litigation and cannot advance certain state or federal welfare challenges. LSC organizations are not able to conduct workshops related to political activities and advocacy as well. Many legal aid organizations refuse to take LSC money, and can continue to file class actions and directly lobby legislatures on behalf of the poor. Many organizations that provide civil legal services are heavily dependent on Interest on Lawyer Trust Accounts for funding. Some civil aid organizations accept private donations and grants if they refuse LSC funding.

However, even with supplemental funding from LSC, the total amount of legal aid available for civil cases is still grossly inadequate. Demand for legal services remains high. In 2018, an estimated 58.5million Americans were eligible for LSC programs. According to LSC's first annual Justice Gap report, initiated by LSC president Helaine M. Barnett in 2005, all legal aid offices nationwide, LSC-funded or not, are together able to meet only about 20 percent of the estimated legal needs of low-income people in the United States. The widely released 2005 report, "Documenting the Justice Gap in America: The Current Unmet Civil Legal Needs of Low-Income Americans," concludes that 86% of civil legal problems facing Americans have received inadequate or no legal assistance in the past year. The report also finds that 71% of low-income households were at some point in need of civil legal services within the year. The report states that "in 2017, low-income Americans approached LSC-funded legal aid organizations for support with an estimated 1.7 million problems. They will receive only limited or no legal help for more than half of these problems due to a lack of resources."

Legal aid at the state level 
The provision of legal services on a federal level through the LSC is largely inadequate, and leaves a large volume of unmet demand. In the absence of a major decision from the Supreme Court affirming the right to civil counsel, as came to pass with criminal matters through Gideon v. Wainwright, States have been left to their own devices to fulfill the high demand for legal services.

A significant development in this area came as every state, beginning with Florida, created some version of an Interest on Lawyer Trust Accounts program.

New York 
Historically, civil legal aid in the United States began in New York with the founding of the Legal Aid Society of New York in 1876. In 2017, New York City became the first place in the US to guarantee legal services to all tenants facing eviction with the passage of the "Right to Counsel Law". The bill was originally introduced in 2014 by New York City Council Members Mark D. Levine and Vanessa Gibson before being expanded into its current form. Funding for legal services centered around eviction and housing will increase over the course of five years, reaching $155million by 2022. The services are to be implemented by the New York City Office of Civil Justice (OCJ) to households making no more than 200% of the federal poverty line.

The legislation includes a provision for OCJ to provide annual reports to monitor the progress and effectiveness of the services being provided. The 2017 reports finds that evictions have declined by 27% since 2013, and that "over the four-year period of 2014 through 2017, an estimated 70,000 New Yorkers remained in their homes as a result of the decreased evictions."

California 
The 2009 Sargent Shriver Civil Counsel Act created a number of pilot programs that advanced representation in civil aid cases regarding basic human needs to assess the benefits of civil legal aid, and the logistics of wider implementation. A 2017 study examined 10 of these legal aid programs, and found that recipients of aid had greatly improved prospects in eviction cases. 67% of cases settled, an increase of 33% compared to self pro per (self represented) cases. Critically, the study found that, "while all Shriver clients received eviction notices, only 6% were ultimately evicted from their homes." If income requirements are not met, legal aid organizations in California funded by the Legal Services Corporation cannot provide services to constituents.  This disproportionately affects Latinos/as living in California.

The San Francisco Board of Supervisors passed an ordinance in 2012 declaring its intention to make San Francisco the first city to guarantee a right to counsel. In June 2018, San Francisco implemented a "Right to Counsel" program guaranteeing legal representation to tenants facing eviction.

Currently, the Los Angeles City Counsel is considering "Right To Counsel" legislation that may look very similar to those being enacted in New York and San Francisco.

Wisconsin 
The Wisconsin Supreme Court joined the Interest on Lawyer Trust Accounts movement in 1986 with the establishment of the Wisconsin Trust Account Foundation.

Pro bono 
The problem of chronic underfunding of legal aid is that it traps the lower middle class in no-man's-land: too rich to qualify for legal aid, too poor to pay an attorney in private practice. To remedy the ongoing shortage of legal aid services, some commentators have suggested that mandatory pro bono obligations ought to be required of all lawyers, just as physicians working in emergency rooms are required to treat all patients regardless of ability to pay. Such proposals have been mostly fought off by bar associations successfully. In their 1993 Model Rule 6.1, the American Bar Association emphasized the importance of attorneys providing a minimum of fifty hours of free legal assistance to low-income litigants annually. To justify this requirement, the American Bar Association has referenced the larger movement to incorporate larger ideals that are central to the legal profession, such as public service and advancing the public good, in actionable ways. Since then, pro bono legal work has become institutionalized in large firms. Before the 1990s, pro bono legal work was provided mainly by small firms; however, by the end of the 1990s, pro bono was distributed "through a network of structures designed to facilitate the mass provision of free services by law firm volunteers acting out of professional duty". 1/3 of Latino lawyers perform pro bono work and 49% of Latino lawyers report to meet this 50 hour annual quota with 8.3% report to providing 200 hours or more. Pro bono services are sometimes awarded by Courts in cases related to employment, sex discrimination, consumer credit and fraud amongst others.

A notable exception is the Orange County Bar Association in Orlando, Florida, which requires all bar members to participate in its Legal Aid Society, by either serving in a pro bono capacity or donating a fee in lieu of service. Even where mandatory pro bono exists, however, funding for legal aid remains severely insufficient to provide assistance to a majority of those in need. Along with challenges in funding, legal scholars argue that the current pro bono system “fails to incentive high-quality legal assistance ... [because it] cannot replace the expertise and experience of seasoned lawyers". The concern is that, since pro bono services are often viewed as an opportunity for professional development for less experienced attorneys, the emphasis shifts away from the quality of services provided for a client to the attorney's growth. Moreover, access to pro bono services is often hindered by geographic access, particularly in rural areas where populations are widely dispersed. Thus, even with an increase in pro bono services, the delivery of these services remains a challenge that stands in the way of addressing the justice gap as a whole.

The term pro bono came into official existence in 1919. Reginald Herber Smith uncovered in his study of how drastically different the poor and rich prevailed in legal matters within the U.S. What Smith honed in on was need for lawyers to serve the "financially unservable", or those that could least afford legal services, but would also significantly benefit from such services. The issue with that notion however, means that a lawyer would not be compensated for their skills, knowledge, and time. Today, there are the "no costs to you" contingent contracts advertised to make a profit in the long run, in addition to the recommendation that private lawyers offer at least 50 hours of pro bono services per year in providing legal aid to those that cannot afford their services.  To be clear, there is no mandate requiring any law firm or legal service providers to part take in either of these processes, only a recommendation that all lawyers "should aspire to" serve, and lawyers who wish to extend themselves in such a capacity must decide to render their services free of charge.

Organizations that offer pro bono services are designed to benefit those in underrepresented groups such as immigrants and refugees. Immigrant lawyers face barriers in their lawyer-client relationships due to the lack of access to justice placed by administrative and political barriers. When it comes to offering legal aid to immigrants in the United States, pro bono services are an important resource for immigrants, but very few can access adequate legal aid. Additionally, there are ethical questions raised by legal aid critiques as to whether or not immigrants should be able to utilize pro bono legal aid services due to their lack of citizenship status. The 14th Amendment calls for equal protection despite national origin, but undocumented non-citizens are not required to be granted equal access under federal law. This tends to bar immigrants from equal access to justice and due process.

Lawyer-client relationships in pro bono services 
A significant debate around pro bono services focuses on the lawyer-client relationship and the distribution of power within it. Since the 1970s, civil rights and public interest organizations have coined and used the concept of "lawyer domination", which is a perception that lawyers act according to their personal beliefs about what path of action would be best for the client. For low-income or minority clients, their submission to the lawyers’ control and authoritative decision-making was seen as the "price of access to the courts". With the lack of financial leverage that clients have over their counsel, lawyers have historically held more paternalistic attitudes to pro bono work, as opposed to a more collaborative approach. From the perspective of legal services lawyers, the assumption is that the "client is interested in a result and comes to you presumably because you know the best way, or the way that is most likely to get that result [...] So, there has to be some reliance on the expertise of the attorney in establishing and suggesting ways to proceed". In thirty-two percent of cases, lawyers referenced making strategic decisions with no participation from the client at all.

Critics argue that interactions between lawyers and clients should be dictated by the guidelines laid out in the American Bar Association's Code of Professional Responsibility. Aside from this code, there is no other description or guidelines for client-lawyer relationships and a great deal of variation, as a result, in practice. The conflict of interest provision of the code ensures that attorneys prioritize loyalty to their clients' goals over their individual interests or external interests. Generally, the code equips lawyers with more power over the 'means' and leaves clients with responsibility for the major decisions of a case (including if a client wants to settle or appeal).

When it comes to immigration courts, relationships between lawyers and their clients are essential to winning deportation cases. This relationship tends to be strained in immigration courts due to the high caseloads and tight deadlines that immigrant lawyers face. The American Bar Association's Code of Professional Responsibility does not include guidelines for immigration lawyers to address the trauma that their clients experience.

Trauma-informed litigation 
The litigation process in immigration courts is challenging for immigrants, as well as for lawyer-client relationships. Research has indicated a “triple trauma paradigm” that immigrants face: trauma suffered during the migration journey, trauma in relocating, and trauma again in the asylum or immigration process. The trauma of applying for relief before an immigration court is given the least public attention. During the litigation process in immigration courts, immigration lawyers place a large emphasis on the traumatic stories immigrants have faced in order to help build their case against deportation.Though consulted, immigrants play a very minimal role in decision-making when it comes to presenting their case in front of a court. The lawyers ultimately make the final decisions and tend to make trauma the centerpiece of representation in court. This process brings up many ethical questions in regards to immigration law as an institution, and legal aid for immigrants as a sector.

Administrative legal aid 
A few states (e.g., California) have also guaranteed the right to counsel for indigent defendants in "quasi-criminal" or administrative law cases like involuntary terminations of parental rights and paternity actions.

Community-based legal aid 
The creation of community-based legal aid organizations typically form in response to people facing disenfranchisement or lack of services, when they are unable to pay for a lawyer. An example of such a community based legal aid program is the creation of the New York's Legal Aid Society, founded in 1876 to help German immigrants deal with a series of issues experienced within their communities. The lack (or inability to navigate and understand the U.S. legal system) led to German-Americans to develop this site to assist the people, who were vulnerable to wage abuse, criminalization, and other legal issues that plagued their lives.  Other organizations would use legal means as practical steps in transforming fundamental American social values and culture.  The National Association for the Advancement of Colored People (NAACP), and American Civil Liberties Union (ACLU), are two of the most recognized legal aid service providers within the U.S., but would come about later, founded in 1909 and 1920s respectively.  Legal aid organizations were formed outside the legitimization scope of the state, using law to pursue, challenge, and change existing legislation that worked against the most vulnerable citizens based upon grounds of race, gender, citizenship, and other categories by which the poor were disadvantaged.

Legal clinics have become centers of legal aid, advice, and sites of holistic approaches to poverty.  Within these spaces, the poor have access to justice, along with a less specialized legal pool of knowledge addressing the more common complaints that impact the day to day on-goings of life, also known as the "generalists" approach, creating a type of "one stop shop" which attempts to have all the legal needs of a client met in a single space, cutting down expenses of having to have multiple lawyers in multiple sites for multiple legal issues. These sites also take into consideration the cultural and social considerations that contribute to the mental and social aversions to be able to seek legal aid by disadvantaged populations.  A crucial part of this model is to meet the client where they are, or at least, be in a location that is actually feasible, and convenient for the client to visit.  Insert neighborhood legal clinics, and their multifaceted approach to a multifaceted issue. Because poverty law "is not a specialized field," there can be multiple issues a single client may experience, possibly simultaneously, and may not be all related to one particular case, or interwoven to such a degree that addressing one part of the problem leads to a chain reaction of sorts to affect all the moving parts.

Impact 
In 2003, a study was published that linked civil legal aid to a marked decline in rates of Intimate partner violence (IPV). Programs funded by the LSC closed 120,944 cases involving domestic violence in 2017 alone. In the decade following this study, a considerable body of research began to take shape investigating the positive impact of civil legal aid. Studies have established legal aid as providing such benefits as decreasing homelessness as well as the need for emergency shelters through reducing evictions. Over the last two decades, civil legal aid services have shown to save the homes of more than 6,000 tenants in New York according to the 1996 study by the Association of the Bar of the City of New York. Because of the fragmented nature of civil legal aid in the US, cost benefit analyses are often specific to a given State. A 2010 article that gathered multiple other studies found that the benefits go beyond reducing domestic violence rates, finding that access to aid also brings more funds into a state by helping individuals receive federal benefits, protecting children, and aiding select groups such as seniors and veterans who are often exploited. A report from the ABA Day in Washington lists a State by State cost benefit analysis, finding a return on investment as high as 9:1 in Alabama in 2015.

East Bay Community Law Center (EBCLC) 
The East Bay Community Law Center provides free legal services to Alameda County residents. There are a variety of legal clinics from Berkeley Boalt Law School and legal divisions within the EBCLC and each has its own criteria establishing potential clients' eligibility for receiving their services. The EBCLC has two locations in Berkeley with one location on University Ave and one on Adeline Street. The EBCLC provides Clean Slate Services, Community Economic Justice Clinic Services, Consumer Justice and General Clinic Services, Education Defense and Justice for Youth Services, Health and Welfare Services, Housing Services, and Immigration services.

Advancing Justice: Asian Law Caucus 
Advancing Justice: Asian Law Caucus is a Bay Area organization that provides legal services, encourages community empowerment, and facilities policy advocacy for immigrants of Asian descent. They provide pro bono legal aid ranging from class action lawsuits to direct services through legal clinics in San Francisco. Additionally, the Asian Law Caucus organizes community movements to raise awareness for immigrants and refugees of Asian descent. The Asian Law Caucus' work is centered around immigrants, refugees, incarcerated people, and low-income workers.

The Fair Debt Buying Practices Act 
Born out of the work of community collaboration, the Fair Debt Buying Practices Act harks back to the original perspective of legal aid; the attainment of justice and fundamental change to a system from the ground up, creating a meaningful societal transformation of out from under poverty, shifting the culture under which American social spaces operate. This was achieved through an effort to serve the community, via an open door General Clinic event, leading the EBCLC to become aware of a disproportionately large number of clients all being sued over credit card debt.  Because the General Clinic allowed for all clients experiencing forms of various legal matters to seek legal assistance, it was able to capture clients along with evidence and data that supported the position that this particular occurrence was a targeted business strategy, preying upon the legally ignorant, marginalized, and poorest citizens.  The ability to deliver legal remedies to the clients was only one part of the solution deployed by EBCLC.  The other half enlisted the collaborative efforts of community members, academic and educational forces (i.e. law students serving the clinic) along with legal proposals to change the laws that allowed for this legal poverty trap to exist.

Limitations of civil legal aid in the Latino community 
Legal services available for Latino and Hispanic clients vary. This clientele can include Spanish speaking and undocumented clients. Latinos often mistake notaries as legal organizations and they turn to notaries for legal advice that they are unqualified to give. The relationship between the Hispanic community and legal aid services can be described as low in confidence. 44% of Hispanics say they have little confidence courts will treat them fairly and 49% believe they will be treated fairly. 19% of Latinos say they or an immediate family member have attended court or have been involved in a criminal matter with brief attorney services. Institutional limitations such as income cut off quotas are a main deterrence in obtaining certain legal aid services for Latinos. For many Hispanic clients, poverty, family composition, and demographics determine social and legal aid needs. Non-legal issues such as stalking, domestic abuse, visa expiration, and language barrier can also affect a client's ability to access legal aid. Lack of diverse racial consciousness can prevent lawyers from providing adequate services for Latino/a and Hispanic clients. At the criminal level, public defenders often do not speak Spanish, and they tend to recommend plea-bargaining over trials for Latino and Hispanic clients.

Serving Latino and Hispanic clients 
If Latino clients have negative encounters with the criminal justice system in their specific counties of origin, they may struggle to understand the legal system of the United States. When providing legal services for Latino clients, legal practitioners should ask what nationality or ethnic group the client is from. Attorneys and legal aid providers should not assume Latino or Hispanic clients speak Spanish. They should confirm what languages the client does speak. It is recommended that legal organizations have Spanish translated documents about legal proceedings so that Spanish speaking clients can understand legal terminology. Undocumented Latinos can suffer additional immigration consequences because the legal representation received by Latino clients in this field of law lack cultural and immigration background.

Latino lawyers 
Latino lawyers serve as resources for advocacy and leadership in the Latino/a community. They are more likely to be a part of a small firm or work in the field of public service and non profit legal services. Latinos make up 3% of lawyers, and are inadequately represented as partners or associates of large law firms, prosecutors, and defense attorneys.

List of Legal Aid Organizations by State

Pennsylvania 
Legal Aid of Southeastern Pennsylvania: Serves Bucks, Montgomery, Chester, and Delaware County

Community Legal Services: Serves Philadelphia County

Mid-Penn Legal Services: Serves Adam, Bedford, Berks, Blair, Centre, Clearfield, Cumberland, Dauphin, Franklin, Fulton, Huntingdon, Juniata, Lancaster, Lebanon, Mifflin, Perry, Schuylkill, and York Counties

Illinois 

Land of Lincoln: Serves Clinton, Fayette, Monroe, Randolph, St. Clair, Washington, Adams, Bond, Brown, Calhoun, Greene, Hancock, Jersey, Macoupin, Madison, Montgomery, Pike, Schuyler, Cass, Christian, Logan, Mason, Menard, Morgan, Sangamon, Scott, Shelby, Champaign, Clark, Coles, Crawford, Cumberland, De Witt, Douglas, Edgar, Effingham, Ford, Jasper, Macon, Moultrie, Piatt, Vermilion, Alexander, Clay, Edwards, Franklin, Gallatin, Hamilton, Hardin, Jackson, Jefferson, Johnson, Lawrence, Marion, Massac, Perry, Pope, Pulaski, Richland, Saline, Union, Wabash, White, and Williamson

Prairie State Legal Services: Serves McLean, Livingston, Woodford, Henderson, Knox, McDonough, Warren, Grundy, Will, Iroquois, Kankakee, Bureau, LaSalle, Putnam, Fulton, Marshall, Peoria, Stark, Tazewell, Henry, Lee, Mercer, Rock Island, Whiteside, Boone, Carroll, Jo Daviess, Ogle, Stephenson, Winnebago, Lake, Dekalb, DuPage, Kane, Kendall, and McHenry Counties

New York City 
New York Legal Assistance Group (NYLAG)

The Legal Aide Society

See also
 Contract attorney
 Legal clinic
 Public defender
 Legal Aid Society
 Legal Aid Society of Cleveland
 New York Legal Assistance Group
 Legal Aid in Texas: Texas Legal Services Center, Texas Rio Grande Legal Aid

References

Further reading
 Batlan, Felice. Women and Justice for the Poor: A History of Legal Aid, 1863–1945. (New York: Cambridge University Press, 2015) xx, 232 pp.
 Houseman, Alan W.  andLinda E. Perle. Securing Equal Justice for All (Washington, DC: CLASP, 3rd rev. ed. 2013)
 Johnson, Earl. To Establish Justice for All: The Past and Future of Civil Legal Aid in the United States: The Past and Future of Civil Legal Aid in the United States (ABC-CLIO, 2013)
 Spiegel, Mark. "Legal Aid 1900 to 1930: What Happened to Law Reform?." DePaul Journal for Social Justice (2015). online

External links 
 Legal Services Corporation (lsc.gov)

 
Law of the United States